Kenton is a railway station on the Watford DC line and the London Underground Bakerloo line, situated on Kenton Road in Kenton, north-west London. The station is served by London Overground and London Underground services. It has an out of station interchange (OSI) with Northwick Park station on the London Underground's Metropolitan line. In the Bakerloo line, the station is between Harrow & Wealdstone and South Kenton stations.

History
The station was one of several built on the London and North Western Railway's "New Line" from Camden to Watford Junction which enabled local services from Watford Junction station to reach Euston station and Broad Street station in London. The New Line was mostly alongside main line of the London and Birmingham Railway in 1837. 

Kenton station was opened on 15 June 1912. It has only ever had platforms on the New Line; parallel main line services call at Harrow and Wealdstone station, one stop to the north, with some also calling at Wembley Central station, three stops to the south. 

Bakerloo line services began on 16 April 1917. On 24 September 1982, Bakerloo line services to Kenton ended when services north of Stonebridge Park were ended. The closure was short-lived, and the Bakerloo line service was reinstated on 4 June 1984.

The station's former coal yard on the east side of the railway, no longer needed for the trains, is now occupied by a Sainsbury's supermarket.

Services
London Overground (Watford DC line) 4 tph in each direction.
London Underground (Bakerloo line) 6 tph in each direction.

Connections
London Buses routes 114, 183, 223, H9, H10, H18 and H19 serve the station.

Access to station
TfL's Getting Around map showing disabled access (dated April 2011) does not indicate that level access is available at this station. The nearest stations shown with step-free access are Harrow and Wealdstone, Kingsbury and Wembley Park; some journeys might be more conveniently made by using one of the local buses to Golders Green Station (via route 183) or Pinner Station (via route 183) and continuing from there.

References

Gallery

External links

Bakerloo line stations
Tube stations in the London Borough of Brent
Railway stations in the London Borough of Brent
DfT Category E stations
Former London and North Western Railway stations
Railway stations in Great Britain opened in 1912
Railway stations served by London Overground
Station
1912 establishments in England